Moosonee Water Aerodrome  is located on the Moose River adjacent to Moosonee, Ontario, Canada.

See also
 Moosonee Airport

References

Moosonee
Registered aerodromes in Cochrane District
Seaplane bases in Ontario